El Picacho is a common geographic name in Latin America, usually in reference to a mountain peak, and may refer to:

 El Picacho (Panama)
 The hill on which Christ at El Picacho stands
 El Picacho Formation  

 There are several peaks within Baja California named El Picacho

See also
 Picacho (disambiguation)